Galeyev is a surname. Notable people with the surname include:

Rinat Galeyev (1939–2007), Russian businessman
Salavat Galeyev (born 1958), Russian footballer and coach
Vadim Galeyev (born 1992), Kazakh cyclist

See also
Ganeyev